In the United States, the definition of cider is broader than in Europe. There are two types: one is the traditional fermented product, called hard cider, and the second is sweet or soft cider. However, in some regions, cider is the alcoholic version, whether made from apples or pears, and apple cider is the non-alcoholic version.

Hard cider

The history of cider in the United States is very closely tied to the history of apple growing in the country. Most of the 17th- and 18th-century emigrants to America from the British Isles drank hard cider and its variants. Apples were one of the earliest known crops in the English-speaking New World; ships' manifests show young saplings being carefully planted in barrels and many hopeful farmers bringing bags of seed with them, with the first settlers headed to what is now the Southeast. Within thirty-five years of the settlement of Jamestown in 1607, the land was put to plow to grow tobacco, which provided a source of revenue for the colonists and made British settlement a success in the New World after several failed attempts. However, other edible cash crops, like rice, maize, and apples, were grown as they had value in the markets of growing cities like London, Edinburgh, Dublin, and Cardiff.

The earliest known provision for cider making is believed to have been carried on the Mayflower itself in 1620. Halfway through the journey, the ship was caught in a storm and one of its beams cracked badly enough to warrant the consideration of turning back to England. "The great iron screw", taken from a cider press, helped brace the beam to keep the ship from breaking up and did it long enough to make it to the New World. Nine days after the Puritans landed (and perhaps in great thanks for having survived the journey at all) a man by the name of William Blackstone planted the first apple trees in the New England colonies. The first recorded shipment of honeybees to America, important for the pollination of apples, is recorded in 1622 in Virginia. In New England, John Winthrop, governor of Massachusetts Bay Colony in 1632, recorded his tenants paying their rent on Governor's Island in two bushels of apples a year. In 1634 Lord Baltimore instructed settlers of the new colony of Maryland to carry across the sea "kernels of pears and apples, especially of Pipins, Pearemains,  and Deesons for making thereafter of Cider and Perry."

There are records of at least one English apple cultivar used for cider and cooking, Catshead, being grown on Berkeley Hundred Plantation in Virginia around this time; later introductions from the UK would have included Foxwhelp, Redstreak, and the extinct Costard. Other records from the Tidewater South show wealthier farmers and plantation owners arranging for the import of French apple varieties, such as Calville Blanc, Pomme d'Api, and Court Pendu Plat, likely in part due to qualities they wanted to improve in the stock available and the difficulty there was in keeping early breed-stock alive. Unbeknownst to the colonists leaving for the New World, they faced an uphill battle  in planting some of their favorite foods, including apples. None of the colonists knew that the honeybee is not a native insect to America and knew absolutely nothing about the husbandry of orchard mason bees, something nobody would put to use until three centuries later. In Europe, honeybees were and still are the main means of pollination for apples, cherries, and pears, and thus some of the earliest pleas for new supplies sent home to Britain by Jamestown colonists were for beehives. Only about 20% of apple trees produced from apple seeds shall grow a fruit comparable to the parent plant, while about 60% will be passable for consumption and the remaining 20% will be "crab apples" unfit for most human tastes. and the records of all the thirteen colonies indicate that the favored method of propagation from 1607 to 1737 was not grafting since this method was expensive and the reserve of the wealthy using crabapple rootstock.

Additionally, the businesses of diseases, pests, and temperature all presented challenges to growing in Eastern America. Normally tent caterpillars are parasites to Southern crab apple trees, black cherry trees, chokecherries, beach plums,  and the sweet crabapple, members of the family Rosaceae native to the Eastern United States. They made no distinction between these and the European derived young apple, cherry, quince, plum, and pear trees the colonists had, which had evolved no defense mechanism against moth larvae that would form large silk bags on the branches and destroy the tree by eating the leaves. Fungi like cedar-apple rust destroyed trees' abilities to produce fruit, since it infects the buds they grow, making them sterile. In the case of the British or French derived  apples, it proved disastrous since unlike native Malus species it had no immunity and would eventually die, covered in cankers.

In 17th century Britain, orchards had been kept in a relatively open area for generations as most of the forest had been already cleared. But in America, leaving the trees without a surrounding fence in the open resulted in attracting nearby populations of black bears, woodchucks, skunks, raccoons, elk, and deer looking for food.  The need for apple cultivars which would have a much higher yield of apples at harvest time proved to be paramount  so that the entire crop would not be lost to animals, something that is still practiced today but began in colonial times. The climate of the American Southeast also had more extremes, where temperatures would easily exceed 26 °C in summer but fall below 3 °C in winter. Most of the cider, cooking, and dessert apples brought from the oceanic climate of Northwest Europe were not bred for sweltering humidity or late season frosts; later in the North settlers from the British Isles had to adapt many of their husbandry practices as well because winter temperatures were bone chillingly cold with long snowy winters and the first frost coming much earlier. In the South, despite the longer growing season, it was a great task just to get apples and pears to live long enough to bear fruit, let alone make cider or perry, and whatever cider they did produce was likely sour and of poor quality.

The earliest known full blown successful orchard in America began in Massachusetts Bay Colony near what is today modern Boston. New England was more successful in producing the first viable apples as evidenced by the fact that the oldest known and named apple varieties come from Massachusetts Bay Colony, Plymouth Colony, and Providence Plantation: Roxbury Russet in 1634, High Top Sweet by 1630, and Rhode Island Greening in 1650, all of which still survive and are still used for cider making and baking of pies. John Endicott, another New Englander, began one of the first known nurseries for apples and pears, and in 1648 he is recorded as selling 500 young trees to a William Trask, for which he received 250 acres of land; approximately 20 years earlier it is believed that he planted a garden full of fruits selected for alcohol production, near what is present day Salem, Massachusetts  of which one example pear tree still survives as evidence.  Later as his trees matured he began to sell them to new settlers and their bounty of cider and perry to local taverns, beginning one of the earliest examples of large scale propagation in the New World of apples and cider. By the 1660s regulations on the consumption and distribution of alcohol were being put into place, and fines were being levied for drunkenness on hard cider in Massachusetts Bay Colony, in Maryland, and Virginia among other places, going by the court records. In 1676,
Nicholas Spencer, secretary of the Virginia House of Burgesses, speculated on the cause of the riots of the past two years, as keeping the law proved difficult: "All plantations flowing with syder, soe unripe drank by our licentious inhabitants, that they allow no time for its fermentation but in their brains."

As time passed, English settlers began coming from different regions, which ones depending on which colony they chose to settle in, but most of them came from areas with long established traditions of apple growing, including the West Midlands, the West Country (largely these two settled in the South), the Channel Islands (in New Jersey), the Home Counties (New York), and East Anglia (New England).  Other settlers came from Sweden, the Highlands of Scotland, Wales, the Netherlands, Western France, the Irish province of Ulster, and (by the end of the 17th century) Southwest Germany and parts of Switzerland, with all of the above settling down on farms and requiring apples that would keep well, could be bartered as payment. In 1682, Governor Carteret of New Jersey wrote, "At Newark is made great quantities of syder, exceeding any that we have in New England, Rhode Island, or Long Island", significant because colonial New Jersey had a colorful mix of British, Swedish, Dutch, and French Huguenots; a thousand hogsheads were filled that year in Newark, or 238, 481 liters in modern measurement.  Even those settlers, such as Germans and Dutch, who did not come from cultures that attached value to alcohol made from apples found that they could sell more of their crop by breeding apples that their neighbors would have wanted. They thus started a trend and bred versatile apples that would go well with a joint of pork, could be peeled and baked in a pie or rendered into apple butter, but also had enough juice to ferment into alcohol and could be pressed into cider come autumn harvest. Further, unbeknownst to the British settlers of central colonies (Pennsylvania especially) and Appalachia, it is highly likely some of the cultivars brought by Germans introduced genetics  that were much hardier to cold weather than the stock they possessed as evidenced by Germany's natural terrain: German weather was back then and still is today often much more snowy than the British Isles, and areas like Hesse, Thuringia, and Mecklenburg, places of origin for German-speaking settlers in the colonies, all have either alpine influenced climates or ones heavily influenced by cold arctic air coming off the Baltic Sea in winter.   The crossbreeding of these on Scottish, English, and Irish farmer's lands via pollination introduced genetics that were very valuable to climates like Southern Appalachia, which is a mountainous region and in winter gets several feet of snow even in the present day, or Pennsylvania, where colonists had to race the clock to harvest apples in autumn and get them in storage to survive winter.  (Swedish settlers in Delaware, New York. and New Jersey unwittingly repeated the process with their introductions from their arctic homeland and through trade with other ethnic groups, notably the Dutch and Englishmen.)  The total result was a rather motley and bizarre foundation stock from all over Northern Europe, and American apples, many of them chance seedlings and  strange breeds of mixed provenance, grew into varieties like the Harrison Cider Apple, Rambo, Black Gilliflower, Newtown Pippin, Green Cheese, and Baldwin.  Many of these older apples are still used in cookery and in cider making even in the present day.

By the 18th century, apple cider was a staple at every family table; at harvest many apples were pressed into cider and the remainder was placed carefully into barrels to store through winter for eating or replenishing supply. Pehr Kalm, a Swedish naturalist, noted in his travels in 1749 that nearly every home on Staten Island (now a part of modern New York City) had a small orchard attached and in the colonial capital, Albany, apples were being pressed for cider to be exported south to New York City  Settlement along the frontier often included a legal requirement whereby an orchard of mature apple trees bearing fruit within three years of settlement were required before a land title was officially granted. For example, The Ohio Company required settlers to plant not less than fifty apple trees and twenty peach trees within three years. These plantings would guarantee land titles. In 1767, the average New England family was consuming seven barrels of hard cider annually, which equates to about 35-gallons per person. By 1775, one in ten New England families, most of them farmers, had a cider mill on the property. In one of his letters to his wife Abigail, John Adams complained explicitly about the quality of Philadelphia alcohols and being homesick for her cider. Thomas Jefferson grew several varieties of apple at his home in Virginia and there are records of his wife Martha Jefferson overseeing their harvest and brewing while she was mistress of the plantation. Ciderkin, a slightly alcoholic beverage made from cider pomace, could also be found on colonial tables, and was often served for breakfast. Applejack, made in the North, was made in a very similar manner to Canadian ice cider every winter and likely would have been familiar to Mrs. Adams as an alternate means to concentrate alcohol when it was far too cold outside to bring out the cider press. The taste for hard cider continued into the 19th century in pockets of the East Coast, but with the double blow of immigration from Central and Eastern Europe, where lager beer is the traditional staple, and the later advent of Prohibition  hard cider manufacturing collapsed and did not recover after the ban on alcohol was lifted.

 It is only in recent years that interest has been revived in hard cider. Surviving heirloom varieties that would have had a role in the old orchards have been carefully catalogued and others have been put up for sale at city farmer's markets, as well as sold by the bushel to businesses wanting to make their own labels. On the East Coast, many have been taking cuttings of trees planted a hundred years ago and blending them experimentally into new brews, with California and the Great Lakes States following suit. Business is currently booming, even outselling the craft beer movement and though it is currently only one percent of the alcoholic beverage market it has skyrocketed and is projected to keep growing. Larger beer brewing companies, whose profits have been suffering for years due to the loss of market share to craft brews and the change in public opinion as to the quality of their product, have bought cider making companies. The company that ferments Bulmers in Ireland purchased Woodchuck Hard Cider in 2012.

There is great diversity of taste in the types of hard cider, made by small local producers all the way up to the big beer conglomerates, and great variation from region to region. Because the US allows brewing for personal use, instructions for making homebrew are readily available on the internet. According to a July 2014 article from a Chicago area newspaper, the city is taking advantage of its proximity to an area in Michigan that has national importance as a major apple growing region. A whole bar dedicated solely to new ciders in the city is up and running and consequentially Great Lakes producers are pressing more and more of the drink: in its first year, Michigan-based Virtue Cider pressed about 20,000 gallons of cider, or 75,708 liters, selling it in Chicago and other markets. In 2013, it pressed about 120,000 gallons (454,249 liters), and for the year 2014 it expects to press more than 200,000 US gallons, or 757,082 liters.

By region

New England hard cider 
The early 20th century was difficult for the New England region in terms of alcohol production. In 1918, the Northeast suffered a particularly brutal winter that led to an apple shortage, and Prohibition and the Volstead Act destroyed most of the cider trees.  As the after-effects of the 18th Amendment continued, Boston and the coastline of Massachusetts grew in importance as places where contraband alcohol from Eastern Canada and the Caribbean could be smuggled in by boat. Unfortunately, because Boston and the small fishing villages that dotted the New England coastline were a gateway from whence the rest of the nation clandestinely got its alcohol, it was much more lucrative to smuggle contraband alcohol than saving a local rural drink from extinction. Then, the Great Depression hit and financial difficulties made many farmers abandon their orchards; the 1985 John Irving book The Cider House Rules shows that much of the surviving orchards' production had switched over to sweet cider by the 1940s, when the novel takes place.

However, the last quarter of the 20th century proved the cider industry in New England had ample potential for revival, since records of how cider was once made were left untouched and the equipment for creating sweet cider could easily be used to produce hard cider. Many of the old presses were also still usable. The wine revolution in California had taken off and often beat European varieties in taste tests, an important step in proving the United States could make quality alcohol other than whisky and opening the floodgates to better quality, more modern machinery and tools. Some of this equipment could also be used in cider making, and it was now possible in New England to order it by catalogue or by asking for the surplus from California winemakers. Heirloom apple varieties still survived in more remote areas of the region, sometimes hidden on abandoned farmland, and New England had contact with other countries such as Canada and Ireland that produced alcohol derived from apples, the latter country exporting it for the Irish expat community in Boston and the large Irish American population in the Northeast.

The earliest attempts for national revival of hard cider took place in New England in the mid-1980s. By the early 1990s cider making had reached the point that the first cider festival took place, and as of August 2014 the region boasted more than 44 different cideries, with eighteen of them in Massachusetts alone. Notable in New England is the production of several different types of cider.  Farmhouse cider is generally a simple, sweet alcoholic cider, while barrel-aged ciders tend to be aged for a few years in red oak barrels, creating a much sharper flavor. Typical production methods do not use the horse and masher system of France or Europe but often are partially mechanical. Ice cider is also a product of the region, relished by Canadian French speakers in the northern parts of Vermont, New Hampshire, and Maine. Producers have learned methods to produce it from their neighbors and relatives over the border, and now ship their product to twenty different states. The conditions in New England are ideal for natural freeze distillation, since New England gets much colder than Western Europe with temperatures falling well below 0 °C by the second week of December. Experimental cider varieties made with ingredients like ginger and spice are also bottled, as is a variety consistent with the original brewing method native to the region in which, after an initial fermentation, sugar and raisins are added to the brew and the liquid is fermented again, boosting the alcoholic content up to 13%.

New York hard cider 
New York City sits at the southern tip of the second most productive area for apple production in the country, the Hudson Valley. It also happens to be in a state noted for having a long and extremely productive history in agriculture: it produces more than enough to feed itself and large swathes of the Northeastern USA's large population.

Naturally, the cider revolution has not left America's largest city indifferent, as the business is proving to be quite lucrative: as of 2013, sales are up 70 percent.  New York City also gets many of New England's best brews shipped by truck every week on top of what it gets natively and is becoming a major distribution center for the product. Hard cider has become a very popular drink among restaurant and bar patrons in their 20s and 30s, and it is quite common straight up as an alternative to beer for a simple meal or more recently behind the bar as the darling of mixologists for cocktails. There is a festival called Cider Week that takes place after the harvest in New York State is complete, with the first leg of it taking place a few days before Halloween until All Souls Day in New York City, and then again from mid-November until just before Thanksgiving in the rest of the Hudson Valley. The event has attracted some big name sponsors, such as Whole Foods and locavore organizations. An October 29, 2013 article of the Village Voice has dubbed the phenomenon as "Applepalooza", and describes VIP taste tests with cheese and a whole plethora of different styles, from foreign French and Spanish types to local, more experimental blends. Across the Hudson River in New Jersey, the oldest producer of Applejack in the land has miraculously been handed down through ten generations and is occasionally found in a New York bartender's arsenal, fueled by a renewed interest in older style cocktails.

As of 2013 there are more than 20 producers in the state of New York, with many more expected to be founded in the years to come.  Apple producers in New York are very happy with the increasing demand as it solves a common problem where a crop of apples may be plentiful but have some blemished specimens that supermarkets will not take; on top of that smaller producers may be freed to use older varieties that russet or cosmetically are ugly, but well suited to being juiced or baked.Andrew Cuomo, the governor, and Senator Charles Schumer are re-evaluating how the local product is taxed to make it more competitive nationally. In New York City itself, a new brewery for hard cider is fully operational and thriving, specializing in artisanal brews. It has named itself Original Sin, a tongue-in-cheek reference to the story in Genesis where Eve bites the apple.  It nods to its local heritage by basing one of its products on an apple cultivar that was born in one of the five boroughs that make up New York City in the 18th century, what is today Queens: Newtown Pippin.

California hard cider 
California is a large contributor to the agriculture business in the United States, growing much of the nation's fruit and vegetables. Settlers coming west over the Sierra Nevadas brought with them their own seeds and saplings in covered wagons, especially to areas north of Sacramento. Very few of these young apple trees would have been of cider making provenance, however their introduction was crucial to intensifying agricultural production in what would become the western United States, contributing to the variety of citrus fruit, grapes, figs, and olives that Spanish settlers had begun in Southern California in the 1700s. New varieties of apples better adapted to the cool and rainy climate slowly were developed, most notably by breeders like Albert Etter and Luther Burbank. During World War II, California often produced the bulk of apples for consumption by troops using just one cultivar: Gravenstein, brought to California by Russian settlers in the 19th century. much of the production was centered around Sonoma and the trees were cut down to make way for vineyards in the subsequent decades.

California is world-famous for grape wine, but a trade magazine listed 28 hard cider producers scattered over the San Joaquin Valley and the Napa region in 2014. Surviving orchards partially provide cideries in California with their cider apples while simultaneously importing other, more bitter, varieties from France and England to diversify the available flavor palate. Some cideries are looking at two particular apple cultivars of West Coast origin that were originally envisioned for cooking, but have a rare mutation: Hidden Rose and Pink Pearl. Both are red fleshed apples that, when pressed, will make a rosé cider.

Like their wine growing neighbors, California cideries do offer tours and taste tests, as well as ship their cider for wider distribution.

Virginia hard cider 
Virginia’s cider scene has exploded over the past few years, with more than 20 cideries across the Commonwealth. Virginia is the sixth-largest apple producing state by acreage in the United States. Cider styles vary from large bottle heirloom ciders to canned and draft cider. Virginia Cider Week is celebrated the second week of every November.

Sweet or soft cider

In current U.S. usage, one must specify if the cider one wants should be hard or regular, for what they receive may be completely devoid of alcohol. To cater to a wide range of customers, even bars or breweries that make their own in-house beers and ciders may still offer the non-alcoholic version; one should not assume they are ordering the alcoholic version.
Sweet cider typically is the direct result of pressed apples; according to the regulations of the Commonwealth of Pennsylvania, apple cider is legally defined as an "amber golden, opaque, unfermented, entirely nonalcoholic juice squeezed from apples".  This is distinct from apple juice, which has a much sweeter taste, is typically heavily filtered, and may or may not be from concentrate. Both products are pasteurized for safety's sake and are unacceptable for consumption or large-scale sale otherwise. Sweet cider is typically drunk in the US as the weather gets colder, and in the East it is often served hot and mulled with spices; it is a feature of end-of-year holidays like Halloween, Thanksgiving, and Christmas.

Sparkling cider, such as that made by a company in California called Martinelli's, is the result of Prohibition Era crackdowns on alcohol and is a carbonated type of juice.  At Thanksgiving and Christmas, it is a favorite drink, served chilled. Sparkling cider (or other sparkling juices such as grape) are often given to children or teetotalers instead of champagne for toasts, for example at weddings or New Year's Eve.

Due to tax legislation in the US, a cider becomes classified as a fruit wine when sugar or extra fruit is added and a secondary fermentation increases the strength.

See also

Applejack
American Wine
Beer in the United States
Cider Act
List of cider brands

References

Cider